The Wright Consort was a bus body built by Wrightbus on various chassis from 1988.

Leyland Roadrunner G571 PNS entered service with Strathclyde Regional Transport in February 1990. This bus was later preserved by the Glasgow Vintage Vehicle Trust (GVVT) and can still be seen at Bridgeton Bus Garage events to this day.

References

Vehicles introduced in 1988
Consort